Following is a list of teams on the 2018–19 World Curling Tour, which was part of the 2018-19 curling season. Only the skips of the teams are listed. For mixed doubles teams, both members of the team are listed.

Men 
As of December 18, 2018

Women 
As of December 19, 2018

Mixed doubles 
As of October 13, 2018

References 

Teams
2019 in curling
2018 in curling
World Curling Tour teams